Garland Jessie Shifflett (March 28, 1935 – May 13, 2020) was an American professional baseball player. A right-handed pitcher born in Elkton, Virginia, Shifflett's 18-year professional career was spent almost exclusively in minor league baseball; the first 16 of those years were spent in one major league organization, with the Washington Senators/Minnesota Twins.

Shifflett had two MLB trials, with the 1957 Senators and the 1964 Twins, appearing in 16 games (all but one in relief) and going winless with two defeats. During his minor league career, from 1955 to 1972, however, Shifflett won 144 games, lost 117 and compiled a 3.14 earned run average in 2,173 innings pitched and 707 appearances. He was a longtime member of the Charlotte Hornets, pitching for them in 11 of his pro seasons (1956–58; 1960; 1962–68).

Shifflett died on May 13, 2020, in Lakewood, Colorado.

References

1935 births
2020 deaths
Baseball players from Virginia
Charleston Senators players
Charlotte Hornets (baseball) players
Chattanooga Lookouts players
Denver Bears players
Erie Senators players
Evansville Triplets players
Major League Baseball pitchers
Minnesota Twins players
Washington Senators (1901–1960) players
People from Rockingham County, Virginia